René Émard (1 September 1914 – 7 June 1984) was a Liberal party member of the House of Commons of Canada. He was born in Châteauguay, Quebec and worked as a unionist. He served during the Second World War in the Régiment de Maisonneuve and the Régiment de la Chaudière.  He was a member of the Canadian occupation force in the Netherlands.

He was first elected in the riding of Vaudreuil—Soulanges in the 1963 general election and re-elected there in 1965. In the 1968 election, he was elected to a third term in the district of Vaudreuil.  Émard retired from Parliament in 1972.  He served as mayor of L'Île-Perrot, Quebec from 1977 to 1981.

External links
 

1914 births
1984 deaths
Trade unionists from Quebec
Canadian military personnel of World War II
Liberal Party of Canada MPs
Members of the House of Commons of Canada from Quebec
Mayors of places in Quebec
People from Châteauguay